Tim or Timothy Brooks may refer to:

 Tim Brooks (basketball) (born 1971), American former professional basketball player in Lithuania
 Tim Brooks (historian) (born 1942), American television and radio historian, author and retired television executive
 Tim Brooks, bassist of American punk band Bold
 Tim Brooks (wrestler) (1947–2020), American professional wrestler
 Verdell Smith (a.k.a. Tim Brooks, born 1963), professional boxer in the light welterweight division
 Tim "Top Gun" Brooks, former guitarist for American pop punk band Set Your Goals
 Timothy L. Brooks (born 1964), American federal judge
 Sir Timothy Brooks (Lord Lieutenant) (1929–2014), English landowner, farmer, politician and public servant

See also
 Timothy Brook (born 1951), Canadian author specializing in the history of China